Inihaw, also known as sinugba or inasal, are various types of grilled or pit-roasted barbecue dishes from the Philippines. They are usually made from pork or chicken and are served on bamboo skewers or in small cubes with a soy sauce and vinegar-based dip. The term can also refer to any meat or seafood dish cooked and served in a similar way. Inihaw are commonly sold as street food and are eaten with white rice or rice cooked in coconut leaves (pusô). Inihaw is sometimes referred to as Filipino barbecue or (informally) Pinoy BBQ.

Description
Inihaw is a general term simply meaning "grilled" or "roasted" in Tagalog, from the verb ihaw ("to grill"). It is also known as sinugba (verb sugba, "to grill") in Cebuano, and inasal (verb asal, "to roast in dry heat, to skewer") in both Cebuano and Hiligaynon. It may also be referred to simply by the English name "barbecue" (usually shortened to "BBQ"), especially for inihaw served in skewers. Inihaw are usually made with pork, beef, or seafood. Cheap versions can also be made with offal.

There are two general types of inihaw. The first are simply meat or seafood grilled directly over charcoal. They are characterized by a charred smoky exterior while remaining moist on the inside. They are usually cubed before serving, and are dipped in various sauces made with a mixture of soy sauce (or salt) and vinegar with fresh red onions, labuyo chilis, calamansi, fresh tomatoes, ground black pepper, and/or sugar. The second type of inihaw are meat or seafood dishes cooked and/or served on a skewer. These include whole roasted animals or cubed meat. Both types may be marinated before cooking and may also be basted while cooking.

The marinating sauce is usually similar to the sauce used for dipping. In skewered inihaw, they are also commonly marinated or basted in a sweet sauce which uses banana ketchup and annatto (achuete) oil which turns them a bright red or orange color. More southern versions known as satti are also served with a peanut-based sauce, similar to satay.

In Visayan-speaking regions, a common combination is "sinuglaw", which combines pork inihaw (sinugba) and kinilaw (raw cubed fish in vinegar and citrus juices).

Variations

Dishes which are types of inihaw but commonly considered to be distinct include the following:

Lechón - spit-roasted whole pig, usually stuffed with spices and lemongrass.
Chicken inasal - a version of lechon manok from the Western Visayas, chicken marinated in a mixture of calamansi, pepper, coconut vinegar and annatto, then grilled over hot coals while basted with the marinade. It is served with rice, calamansi, soy sauce, chicken oil and vinegar (often sinamak vinegar, a palm vinegar infused with garlic, chili peppers and langkawas).
Lechon manok - spit-roasted chicken dish made with chicken marinated in a mixture of garlic, bay leaf, onion, black pepper, soy sauce, and patis (fish sauce). The marinade may also be sweetened with muscovado or brown sugar. It is stuffed with tanglad (lemongrass) and roasted over charcoal. It is typically eaten dipped in a toyomansi or silimansi mixture of soy sauce, calamansi, and labuyo chilis. It is paired with white rice or puso and commonly served with atchara pickles as a side dish. It is a very popular dish in the Philippines and is readily available at roadside restaurants.
Satti - are usually grilled beef or chicken served on skewers from Mindanao. It is related to the satay and sate of Indonesia and Malaysia. They are usually eaten with ta'mu (rice cooked in coconut leaves, pusô in other Philippine languages) and a bowlful of warm sauce which is usually peanut-based.
Isaw - a type of very cheap skewered inihaw made from pig or chicken intestines. They are cooked and eaten in the same way as meat inihaw. Other types of offal-based inihaw are also eaten, usually with humorous names due to their crude resemblance to various everyday objects. They include "walkman" (pig's ears), "betamax" (cubes of pork blood), "helmet" (chicken head), and "adidas" (chicken feet).

Gallery

See also

 Kinilaw
 Philippine adobo
Regional variations of barbecue
List of barbecue dishes

References

Offal
Street food in the Philippines
Philippine cuisine